Wizard Power Pty Ltd was an Australian company focused on solar technology research, development, and commercialization. The company was headquartered in Canberra, Australia. It was wound up in September 2013, owing 8 million dollars to creditors and employees.

Technology
Wizard Power's technology portfolio used to include:

 The Big Dish solar thermal concentrator. The Big Dish is the world's largest and highest performance paraboloidal dish solar concentrator capable of generating temperatures over 1,200oC for superheating steam or powering thermochemical processes. The energy generated through these processes is used for electricity production, energy storage, thermochemistry or process heat.
 focally accurate, solar mirror panel technology for Big Dishes and other solar concentrators.
 A suite of unique thermal and thermochemical solar energy storage systems.

These technologies enable the delivery of utility-scale, zero-emission thermal and electrical energy for dispatchable power applications.  The Australian National University developed the first versions of these technologies over a period of more than 30 years.  The current Wizard Power Big Dish ‘commercial’ design, represented by the prototype located at the ANU, is based on novel space-frame and mirror panel systems that are optimised for the cost-effective deployment of large (tens to hundreds of megawatt capacity) solar fields.

Wizard Power claimed they provided the research, development, technology support, and systems integration services necessary to facilitate the development of solutions and projects using these technologies.

In addition to these technologies, Wizard Power was supposedly developing high-temperature solar gasification solutions for the conversion of coal, biomass, and other carbonaceous materials to liquid fuels, plastics, and fertilizers.

Wizard Power tried to establish a demonstration site in Whyalla, South Australia, which would have showcased the company's energy storage technologies.  The Whyalla Solar Storage plant would have been a pre-commercial demonstration of energy storage, with full integration, demonstration of start-up and shutdown procedures, ability to handle intermittent solar input, and deliver energy on demand.  This project has been supported by the Commonwealth Government of Australia's Advance Electricity Storage Program.

The Whyalla SolarOasis  would have used 300 Wizard Power Big Dish solar thermal concentrators to deliver a 40MWe solar thermal power plant.  It was to be built 4  km north of Whyalla adjacent to the solar storage research facility.  The plant is designed as a peaking power plant operating in the day and early evening to deliver electricity when it is most in demand.

230 million dollar project failure

A $230 million  project was to use Wizard Power Technology to generate 66GWh of solar electricity each year. For a variety of commonwealth and corporate mismanagement reasons, the project did not proceed past the proposal stage.

Renewable Energy Demonstration Program

The Whyalla SolarOasis has been supported by the Australian Government's Renewable Energy Demonstration Program  with a A$60 million grant and will be developed by the SolarOasis consortium.

The Commonwealth funding was canceled in June 2013.

References

External links 
 ANU Solar Thermal Group

Solar energy companies
Solar thermal energy